Alec Rupen Costandinos, (born Alexandre Garbis Sarkis Kouyoumdjian in 1944 in Cairo, Egypt) is a French composer, music producer, songwriter and singer of the 1970s, known for his contributions to disco music. His father was Armenian and his mother was Greek. Costandinos dominated the disco and Euro-disco genres in the late 1970s. He began his career as a publisher and producer for various artists, including French pop star Claude Francois and chanteuse Dalida. After writing Cerrone's "Love in C Minor" (1976), Costandinos was signed to Barclay Records. He released his first album, Love & Kisses in 1977, which featured the hit track "I Found Love (Now That I Found You)". Costandinos went on to release a number of wildly successful records under the prominent American disco label, Casablanca. His album, Romeo & Juliet has been credited for bringing the concept album to dance music. He also wrote "Thank God It's Friday", the theme track to the disco film by the same name.

Costandinos was involved as a writer in the development of many productions of Demis Roussos. He also contributed to the debut album of Crystal Grass, which featured the club hit "Crystal World", released on the Philips label in France. He has also written under the pseudonym R. Rupen. He often worked with a collective of backing singers, the Birds of Paris, some of whom later became famous in their own right. According to what he declared in one of his rare interviews on 11 December 2011 at Open House Radio (Miami), his disco works were basically influenced by Philly sound, classical and melodic Italian music.

Discography
 1977 Romeo & Juliet (Casablanca)
 1978 Hunchback of Notre Dame (Casablanca)
 1978 Trocadero Bleu Citron (Casablanca)
 1979 The Synchophonic Orchestra Featuring Alirol and Jacquet (Casablanca)
 1979 Winds of Change (Casablanca)
 1981 Americana (RCA)

With Love & Kisses
 1977 Love and Kisses (Casablanca)
 1978 How Much, How Much I Love You (Casablanca)
 1979 You Must Be Love (Casablanca)
 1982 Bap Bap/Right Here in My World (Disc'AZ)

With others
 1977 Judas (as Sphinx) (Casablanca)
 1977 Golden Tears (as Sumeria) (Casablanca)
 1978 Trocadero Bleu Citron – Original Soundtrack (Casablanca)
 1978 Paris Connection (Casablanca)
 1979 Winds of Change – Original Soundtrack (Casablanca)
 1980 John And Arthur Simms (Casablanca) The Birds of Paris
 1981 Le Group (Disc'AZ)

See also
List of number-one dance hits (United States)
List of artists who reached number one on the US Dance chart

References

External links 
 

1944 births
Living people
Singers from Cairo
Eurodisco musicians
Egyptian emigrants to France
French people of Armenian descent
French people of Greek descent
Ethnic Armenian male singers